Alfred E. Lehman (June 15, 1924 - December 17, 2001) was an American costume designer. He won an Primetime Emmy Award and was nominated for five more in the category Outstanding Costumes for his work on the television programs Laverne & Shirley, Buck Rogers in the 25th Century and Murder, She Wrote. Lehman died in December 2001 of cancer at his home in North Hollywood, California, at the age of 77.

References

External links 

1924 births
2001 deaths
People from New York (state)
American costume designers
Primetime Emmy Award winners
Deaths from cancer